The Durgabai Deshmukh South Campus metro station is located on the Pink Line of the Delhi Metro. It has been built as a part of Phase III of Delhi Metro.

There is also an interchange facility with Dhaula Kuan metro station of the Airport Express Line. The footover bridge opened on 9 February 2019, and both the stations are connected by a 1.2 km long skywalk having a record 22 travellators for hassle-free commuting.

Located on the Ring Road, near the turning of Benito Juarez Marg, this station is expected to improve connectivity to the South Campus of Delhi University and nearby colleges.

History
The station was originally named just South Campus. In December 2014, the Delhi government changed the name to Durgabai Deshmukh South Campus.

The station

Station layout

Entry/Exit

Connections

Bus
Delhi Transport Corporation bus routes number 323, 392, 392B, 398, 442, 448, 448A, 448B, 448CL, 448EXT, 479, 479CL, 507CL, 511, 511A, 523, 529SPL, 543A, 567, 567A, 568, 568A, 569, 588, 611, 611A, 702, 711, 711A, 724, 724C, 724EXT, 794, 794A, 864, 874, 984A, AC-479, AC-711, AC-724, AC-724A, AC-Anand Vihar ISBT Terminal – Gurugram Bus Stand, Anand Vihar ISBT Tererminal – Gurugram Bus Stand, OMS (+) (-), TMS (-)
TMS-Azadpur-Lajpat, TMS-Lajpat Nagar, TMS-PBagh serves the station from nearby Satya Niketan bus stop.

See also

Delhi
List of Delhi Metro stations
Transport in Delhi
Delhi Metro Rail Corporation
Delhi Suburban Railway
Inner Ring Road, Delhi
South Extension
Delhi Monorail
Delhi Transport Corporation
South Delhi
New Delhi
National Capital Region (India)
List of rapid transit systems
List of metro systems

References

External links

 Delhi Metro Rail Corporation Ltd. (Official site)
 
 UrbanRail.Net – descriptions of all metro systems in the world, each with a schematic map showing all stations.

Delhi Metro stations
Railway stations in India opened in 2018
Railway stations in South Delhi district
Memorials to Durgabai Deshmukh
Railway stations at university and college campuses